A mortis, also spelt mortrose, mortress, mortrews, or mortruys, was a sweet pâté of a meat such as chicken or fish, mixed with ground almonds, made in Medieval, Tudor and Elizabethan era England. It is known from one of England's earliest cookery books, The Forme of Cury (1390), and other manuscripts.

Dish

A Tudor mortis recipe for chicken is given in The Good Huswifes Jewell, an English cookery book of 1585 by Thomas Dawson. He instructs:

The dish consists of meat, such as chicken or fish, boiled and pounded with blanched almonds and milk into a smooth paste. This is then cooked gently with sugar.

An earlier recipe for "mortrose of fyshe" (fish mortis) is given in the 1390 cookery book, The Forme of Cury, written for King Richard's cooks. It called for houndfish, haddock, or cod, using the liver as well as the flesh, mixed with milk, white breadcrumbs and sugar. A similar recipe appeared in Gentyll Manly Cokere in the Pepys Manuscript 1047, dating from around 1490.

The Beinecke manuscript describes a saffron-yellow "mortruys" of mixed chicken and pork, thickened with egg:

The name of the dish most likely derives from the mortar and pestle used to prepare it. Terry Breverton, in The Tudor Kitchen: What the Tudors Ate & Drank (2015), suggests putting the mortis into individual ramekins and chilling them before serving.

References

English cuisine
Medieval cuisine
British chicken dishes
Fish dishes